The following outline is provided as an overview of and topical guide to the U.S. state of Washington:

Washington is a state in the Pacific Northwest region of the United States, and is named after George Washington, the first President of the United States (it is the only U.S. state named after a president). Washington was carved out of the western part of Washington Territory which had been ceded by Britain in 1846 by the Oregon Treaty as settlement of the Oregon Boundary Dispute. It was admitted to the Union as the 42nd state in 1889. The state's population at the 2010 United States Census was 6,724,540. Washington is often called Washington State or the state of Washington to distinguish it from Washington, D.C.

General reference 

 Names
 Common name: Washington
 Pronunciation: 
 Official name: State of Washington
 Abbreviations and name codes
 Postal symbol:  WA
 ISO 3166-2 code: US-WA
 Internet second-level domain: .wa.us
 Nicknames
The Evergreen State (currently used on license plates without "the")
 Apple State
 Chinook State
 Adjectival: Washington
 Demonym: Washingtonian

Geography of Washington 

 Washington is: a U.S. state, a federal state of the United States of America
 Location
 Northern hemisphere
 Western hemisphere
 Americas
 North America
 Anglo America
 Northern America
 United States of America
 Contiguous United States
 Canada–US border
 Western United States
 West Coast of the United States
 Northwestern United States
 Pacific Northwest
 Population of Washington: 6,724,540  (2010 U.S. Census)
 Area of Washington:
 Atlas of Washington

Places in Washington 

 Historic places in Washington
 Abandoned communities in Washington
 Ghost towns in Washington
 National Historic Landmarks in Washington
 National Register of Historic Places listings in Washington
 Bridges on the National Register of Historic Places in Washington
 National Natural Landmarks in Washington
 National parks in Washington
 State parks in Washington

Environment of Washington 

 Climate of Washington
 Climate change in Washington (state)
 Geology of Washington
 Protected areas in Washington
 State forests of Washington
 National Wildlife Refuges in Washington
 Superfund sites in Washington
 Wildlife of Washington
 Fauna of Washington
 Birds of Washington
 Amphibians and reptiles of Mount Rainier National Park

Natural geographic features of Washington 

 Lakes of Washington
 Mountains of Washington
 Highest mountain peaks in Washington
 Rivers of Washington

Regions of Washington 

 Cascade Range
 Central Washington
 Columbia Gorge
 Columbia Plateau
 Columbia River
 Eastern Washington
 Inland Empire
 Kitsap Peninsula
 Long Beach Peninsula
 Okanogan Country
 Olympic Peninsula
 Palouse
 Puget Sound
 San Juan Islands
 Skagit Valley
 Western Washington
 Yakima Valley

Administrative divisions of Washington 

 The 39 Counties of the State of Washington
 Municipalities in Washington
 Cities in Washington
 State capital of Washington: Olympia
 Largest city in Washington: Seattle
 City nicknames in Washington
 Towns in Washington
 Unincorporated communities in Washington
 Census-designated places in Washington

Demography of Washington

Government and politics of Washington 

 Elections in Washington (state)
 Electoral reform in Washington
 Washington initiatives to the people
 Political party strength in Washington
 Washington initiatives to the legislature
 Washington's Lottery

Federal representation 
 United States congressional delegations from Washington
 List of United States senators from Washington
 Patty Murray
 Maria Cantwell
 List of United States representatives from Washington
 Congressional districts of Washington

State government of Washington 

 Form of government: U.S. state government
 Washington State Capitol

Executive branch of the government of Washington 
Governor of Washington
Lieutenant Governor of Washington
 Secretary of State of Washington
 State departments
 Washington State Department of Transportation

Legislative branch of the government of Washington 

 Washington State Legislature (bicameral)
 Upper house: Washington State Senate
 Lower house: Washington House of Representatives

Judicial branch of the government of Washington 

 Washington Supreme Court

Law and order in Washington 

Law of Washington (state)
 Cannabis in Washington (state)
 Capital punishment in Washington (state)
 Individuals executed in Washington
 Washington State Constitution
 Gun laws in Washington
 Law enforcement in Washington
 Law enforcement agencies in Washington
 Same-sex marriage in Washington

Military in Washington 

 Washington Military Department
 Washington National Guard
 Washington Air National Guard
 Washington Army National Guard
 Washington State Guard

Local government in Washington 

 City government in the state of Washington

History of Washington 

History of Washington (state)
 Outline of Washington territorial evolution

History of Washington, by period 

Prehistory of Washington
Kennewick Man
Marmes Rockshelter
Modern exploration of Washington, 1592–1818
Ioánnis Fokás may have explored the Strait of Juan de Fuca, 1592
Juan José Pérez Hernández's northern voyage, 1774
Bruno de Heceta sights the mouth of the Columbia River, 1775
Charles William Barkley, captain of the Imperial Eagle, explores and names the Strait of Juan de Fuca, 1787
Robert Gray explores and names the Columbia River, 1792
William Robert Broughton's voyage to the Columbia River Gorge, 1792
Lewis and Clark Expedition, 1804–1806
David Thompson's voyage on the Columbia River, 1811–1812
Oregon Country, 1818–1846
Anglo-American Convention of 1818
Fort Vancouver, 1824–1866
Provisional Government of Oregon, 1843–1848
Oregon Treaty of 1846
Unorganized territory of the United States, 1846–1848
Oregon Territory, (1848–1853)-1859
Washington Territory, 1853–1889
Puget Sound War, 1855–1856
Yakima War, 1855–1858
Okanagan Trail, 1858–1859
Pig War, 1859
State of Washington since November 11, 1889
Great Depression, 1929-1939
 1933 Yakima Valley Strike
 Grand Coulee Dam, 1933-1942
World War II, 1939–1945
Japanese American internment, 1942–1945
Hanford Site, 1943
Mount Saint Helens eruption of 1980

Culture of Washington 

Culture of Washington
 Museums in Washington
 Religion in Washington
 The Church of Jesus Christ of Latter-day Saints in Washington
 Episcopal Diocese of Washington
 Scouting in Washington
 State symbols of Washington
 Flag of the State of Washington 
 Seal of the State of Washington

The Arts in Washington 
 Music of Washington

Sports in Washington

Economy and infrastructure of Washington 

Economy of Washington
 Agriculture in Washington
 Communications in Washington
 Newspapers in Washington
 Radio stations in Washington
 Television stations in Washington
 Energy in Washington
 Hydro power in Washington
 Power stations in Washington
 Solar power in Washington (state)
 Wind power in Washington (state)
 Health care in Washington
 Hospitals in Washington
 Mountain recreation economy of Washington
 Transportation in Washington
 Airports in Washington
 Ferries in Washington
 Rail transport in Washington
 Railroads in Washington
 Roads in Washington
 Interstate Highways in Washington
 State Highways in Washington

Education in Washington 

Education in Washington (state)
 K-12 schools in Washington
 Washington Assessment of Student Learning
 High schools in Washington
 Homeschooling in Washington
 Private schools in Washington
 Administration of K-12 schools in Washington
 Washington State Board of Education
 Washington State Office of Superintendent of Public Instruction
 School districts in Washington
 Rural school districts in Washington
 Educational Service Districts in Washington
 Other related to K-12 education in Washington
 Washington State Office of Education Ombudsman
 Higher education in Washington
 Colleges and universities in Washington
 University of Washington
 Washington State University
 Administration of higher education in Washington
Washington State Higher Education Coordinating Board

See also

 
Topic overview:
Washington (state)

Index of Washington (state)-related articles

References

External links 

Washington (state)
Washington (state)
 1